Arabis pycnocarpa, the slender rock cress, is a species of flowering plant in the family Brassicaceae. It is native to North America and eastern Asia, being found in rocky, calcareous areas.

Description
It is a small perennial or biennial that has white flowers in the spring.
Two varieties have been named that are distinguished by pubescence differences:
Arabis pycnocarpa var. adpressipilis – native only to eastern North America
Arabis pycnocarpa var. pycnocarpa – widespread across North America and Asia

See also 

 List of Arabis species

References

pycnocarpa
Flora of North America
Flora of temperate Asia
Plants described in 1937